Prisoner's cinema is the phenomenon of a "light show" of various colors that appear out of the darkness. The light has a form, but those that have seen it find it difficult to describe. Sometimes, the cinema lights resolve into human or other figures.

The phenomenon is reported by prisoners confined to dark cells and by others kept in darkness, voluntarily or not, for long periods of time. It has also been reported by truck drivers, pilots, and practitioners of intense meditation. Astronauts and other individuals who have been exposed to certain types of radiation have reported witnessing similar phenomena.

Scientists believe that the cinema is a result of phosphenes combined with the psychological effects of prolonged lack of exposure to light, and others have noted a connection between the form the lights take and neolithic cave paintings.

Popular culture
The pilot episode for the original Twilight Zone series, "Where Is Everybody?," depicts elaborate, fully realistic hallucinations by a test subject undergoing prolonged isolation and sensory deprivation as part of research into human space travel.

See also
Charles Bonnet syndrome
Closed-eye hallucination
Dreaming
Dark retreat
Eigengrau
Ganzfeld effect
Hypnagogia
Isolation tank
Phosphene
Sensory deprivation

References

External links
The opening sequence of the TV series Magic Shadows includes an artist's depiction of "prisoners cinema" illustrating its rapid succession of half-formed figures and images (from 0:38 to 0:49 in the linked video).
Why does watching Phosphenes make me fall asleep? Salvatore Cullari, Lebanon Valley College

Forteana
Visual system
Hallucinations